

Champion
On April 2, 1976, at home in Selkirk, the Steelers won the MJHL title for the third consecutive 
year, capturing the Turnbull Memorial Trophy.

League notes
The MJHL expands to Thompson, the Thompson King Miners join the league's North Division. Kenora Muskies will shift to the South Division. A pair of teams change their names, the Winnipeg Monarchs become the Assiniboine Park Monarchs and the Kenora Muskies are renamed the Kenora Thistles, in honor of the Stanley Cup winning team.

Regular season

Playoffs
Division Semi-Finals
Selkirk defeated Dauphin 4-games-to-1
Brandon defeated Portage 4-games-to-1
West Kildonan defeated Assiniboine Park 4-games-to-1
St. Boniface lost to St. James 4-games-to-1
Divisional Finals
Selkirk defeated Brandon 4-games-to-1
West Kildonan defeated St James 4-games-to-3
Turnbull Cup Championship
West Kildonan lost to Selkirk 4-games-to-none
Anavet Cup Championship
Selkirk lost to Prince Albert Raiders (SJHL) 4-games-to-1

Awards

All-Star Teams

References
Manitoba Junior Hockey League
Manitoba Hockey Hall of Fame
Hockey Hall of Fame
Winnipeg Free Press Archives
Brandon Sun Archives

MJHL
Manitoba Junior Hockey League seasons